Echinophacops is a genus of trilobites in the order Phacopida, that existed during the lower Devonian in what is now China. It was described by Zhou in 1983, and the type species is Echinophacops mirabilis. The type locality was the Zhusileng Formation in Inner Mongolia.

References

External links
 Echinophacops at the Paleobiology Database

Phacopida genera
Fossil taxa described in 1983
Devonian trilobites of Asia
Fossils of China